WJPG (88.1 FM) is a radio station broadcasting a Contemporary Christian format.  Licensed to the Cape May Court House, section of Middle Township, Cape May County, New Jersey, United States.  The station is currently owned by Maranatha Ministries and features programming from Salem Communications.  The station is simulcast on 88.9 WJPH in Woodbine.

History
The station went on the air as WJPG on May 22, 1997.  On March 12, 2004, the station changed its call sign to the current WJPG.

References

External links

Middle Township, New Jersey
JPG
Moody Radio affiliate stations